These are the partial results of the athletics competition at the 1959 Mediterranean Games taking place between 19 and 23 October in Beirut, Lebanon.

Results

100 meters
Heats – 19 October

Semifinals – 19 October

Final – 20 October

200 meters
Heats – 21 October

Final – 22 October

400 meters
Heats – 20 October

Final – 21 October

800 meters
Heats – 19 October

Final – 20 October

1500 meters
22 October

5000 meters
21 October

10,000 meters
19 October

Marathon
22 October

110 meters hurdles
Heats – 21 October

Final – 22 October

400 meters hurdles
Heats – 19 October

Final – 20 October

3000 meters steeplechase
22 October

4 × 100 meters relay
21 October

4 × 400 meters relay
22 October

20 kilometers walk

High jump
20 October

Pole vault
22 October

Long jump
21 October

Triple jump
19 October

Shot put
21 October

Discus throw
20 October

Hammer throw
19 October

Javelin throw
22 October

Decathlon
17–18 October

References

Day 2 results
Day 3 results
Day 4 results

Mediterranean Games
1959